Jaroslav Kačmarčík (born 3 March 1954) is an orienteering competitor who competed for Czechoslovakia. At the 1979 World Orienteering Championships in Tampere he won a bronze medal in the relay, together with Petr Uher, Zdeněk Lenhart and Jiří Ticháček. 

At the 1981 World Orienteering Championships he placed 7th in the individual contest, and fourth in the relay with the Czechoslovak team.

In 1983 in Zalaegerszeg he placed 6th in the individual contest, and won a silver medal in the relay, together with Vlastimil Uchytil, Pavel Ditrych and Josef Pollák.

Kačmarčík is a Park World Tour council member from year 1996. 
Member of International Orienteering Federation - Global Development Commission

References

1954 births
Living people
Czechoslovak orienteers
Male orienteers
Foot orienteers
World Orienteering Championships medalists